Intersection or intersect may refer to:

 Intersection in mathematics, including:
 Intersection (set theory), the set of elements common to some collection of sets
 Intersection (Euclidean geometry)
 Intersection theory
 Intersection (road), a place where two roads meet (line-line intersection)
 Intersection (aviation), a virtual navigational fix
 Intersection (land navigation), a method of obtaining a fix on an unknown position from two mapped points 
 Intersection matrix in DE-9IM, the dimensionally extended nine-intersection model
 Intersectionality, a sociological theory about categorizations (e.g. ethnicity, gender, and religion) and the way those categorizations interact
 Intersect (SQL), a set operator in SQL
 Intersect (video game)
 Logical conjunction
 Intersection (group), a Japanese boy band

Media 
 Intersection (novel), a 1967 novel by Paul Guimard
 Intersection (1994 film), a 1994 remake of the French film Les Choses de la vie, based on Guimard's novel
 Collision (2013 film) a.k.a. Intersection, a French thriller film
 Intersection (album), 2012 album by Nanci Griffith
 An element in the reality TV series The Amazing Race
 Intersections (1985–2005), a 2006 music CD box set released by Bruce Hornsby
Intersections (Dave House album), 2009
 Intersections (Mekong Delta album),  2012
 Intersect (2020 film), an American thriller film

Places
 Intersections, Virginia

Events
 Intersection, 53rd World Science Fiction Convention, held in Glasgow, Scotland, in 1995
 Intersections (arts festival)